Maîtresse Délai is the patron loa of tambourine players in Vodou. She walks with the tambourine player (the hountor).

References

Voodoo goddesses
Tutelary deities